Petelia medardaria is a moth of the family Geometridae first described by Gottlieb August Wilhelm Herrich-Schäffer in 1856. It is found in the Indian subregion, Sri Lanka, Malaysia, Borneo, Queensland and the Bismarck Islands.

It is a small straw-coloured moth. Its wingspan is 3 cm. Dark spots are found near the wingtips and/or a dark line on each wing. A strong discal spot is found on the underside of the hindwing. Host plants of the caterpillar include Gouania leptostachya, Ziziphus incurva, Ziziphus jujube, Ziziphus mauritiana, Ziziphus oenoplia, Ziziphus rugosa and Hovenia dulcis.

References

External links
Morphology of the external male genitalia of five Indian geometrid species

Moths of Asia
Moths described in 1856